Michel Balbuena (born 7 August 1954) is a Spanish racing cyclist. He rode in the 1979 Tour de France.

References

External links
 

1954 births
Living people
Spanish male cyclists
Place of birth missing (living people)
Sportspeople from León, Spain
Cyclists from Castile and León